From This Day Forward is a 1946 American drama film directed by John Berry, starring Joan Fontaine and Mark Stevens.

Plot
Army sergeant Bill Cummings (Mark Stevens) is about to be discharged after service in World War II. He was a blue collar worker in civilian life and is seeking employment. As he fills out forms and speaks to personnel at the United States Employment Service, he thinks back on the life events that brought him to this point.

Flashbacks show him at various times in his prewar life. He is shown meeting and marrying his wife Susan (Joan Fontaine) in 1938. Other flashbacks describe their hardscrabble life in a poor neighborhood of New York City during the Great Depression. He and various relatives are shown as frequently unemployed and having difficulty making a living.

He and Susan's financial ups and downs are depicted, as are the humiliation of being supported by Susan's bookstore clerking job, and unfairly being prosecuted as a pornographer.

At the conclusion of the film, he is shown being referred to a badly needed job interview, and we learn that Susan is pregnant.

Cast
 Joan Fontaine as Susan Cummings
 Mark Stevens as Bill Cummings
 Rosemary DeCamp as Martha Beesley
 Harry Morgan as Hank Beesley 
 Wally Brown as Jake Beesley
 Arline Judge as Margie Beesley
 Renny McEvoy as Charlie Beesley
 Bobby Driscoll as Timmy Beesley
 Mary Treen as Alice Beesley
 Queenie Smith as Mrs. Beesley
 Doreen McCann as Barbara Beesley
 Erskine Sanford as Mr. Higgler
 unbilled players include Ellen Corby, Ralph Dunn, Blake Edwards, Milton Kibbee, Tommy Noonan and Moroni Olsen

Political context
Called "the most expressively optimistic film of the postwar Left" and "literally working-class cinema", the screenplay was adapted from the 1936 novel "All Brides are Beautiful" by working-class immigrant novelist Thomas Bell.  Director Berry and screenwriter Hugo Butler would both be caught in the Hollywood blacklist, and the uncredited writer Odets appeared as a HUAC friendly witness.

Reception
The New York Times reviewer called the film "a plotless succession of episodes," and said "there may be some purpose in all this but we couldn't quite make it out—unless it is simply to demonstrate that unemployment is a very bad thing." The critic said that Fontaine's performance as a Bronx housewife was unconvincing.

Variety said the flashbacks make "it sometimes difficult to follow as a whole, but there can be no quarrel with the merit of presentation and acting of the individual sequences."

A Cincinnati Enquirer reviewer praised the performances and the film's "extraordinarily realistic touches," though he noted a "somewhat involved story-telling method."

Time Out Film Guide said that "such strands as post-war optimism, the impact of neo-realism, the socialist convictions of director and chief writer (Butler), both blacklist-bound, can easily be picked out. But as ever when Hollywood tried to engage with everyday realities, the trade off came in glamourisation - syrupy music, Fontaine (as Stevens' wife) never looking less than a film star, and an idea of poverty that must have irritated many audiences on home ground, never mind in Europe."

Reception
The film made a profit of $362,000.

Radio adaptation
From This Day Forward was presented on Lux Radio Theatre October 28, 1946. Fontaine and Stevens reprised their roles in the adaptation.

References

External links
 
 Turner Classic Movies page

1946 films
Films directed by John Berry
RKO Pictures films
Films based on American novels
Films set in the Bronx
Films scored by Leigh Harline
American drama films
1946 drama films
American black-and-white films
1940s American films